Stranger to Stranger is the thirteenth solo studio album by American folk rock singer-songwriter Paul Simon. Produced by Paul Simon and Roy Halee, it was released on June 3, 2016 through Concord Records. Simon wrote the material over a period of several years, perfecting it and rewriting it to his liking. Its music is experimental, making use of custom-made instruments by composer and music theorist Harry Partch. Three of the songs on the album are collaborations with Italian electronic artist Clap! Clap!.

His first release in over five years, Stranger to Stranger received wide critical acclaim. It represented Simon's highest-ever debut on the Billboard 200, at No. 3, and reached No. 1 on the UK Albums Chart.

Background
Simon began writing new material shortly after releasing his twelfth studio album, So Beautiful or So What, in April 2011. Simon collaborates with the Italian electronic dance music artist Clap! Clap! on three songs—"The Werewolf", "Street Angel", and "Wristband". Simon was introduced to him by his son, Adrian, who was a fan of his work. The two met up in July 2011 when Simon was touring behind So Beautiful or So What in Milan, Italy. He and Clap! Clap! worked together via email over the course of making the album. Simon also worked with longtime friend Roy Halee, who is listed as co-producer on the album. Halee, who had retired years earlier, was mostly recruited to advise on how to create natural echo. He was unfamiliar with Pro Tools, so Simon helped him with it. "I always liked working with him more than anyone else," Simon noted.

Composition
Andy Greene of Rolling Stone dubbed Stranger to Stranger an "experimental album heavy on echo and rhythm that fuses electronic beats with African woodwind instruments, Peruvian drums, a gospel music quartet, horns and synthesizers." The album makes use of custom-made instruments, such as the Cloud-Chamber Bowls and the Chromelodeon, which were created by music theorist Harry Partch in the mid-twentieth century. Simon briefly moved the sessions to Montclair State University, where the instruments are stored, in 2013 in order to employ them on the album. "Parch said there were 43 tones to an octave and not 12," Simon remarked in Rolling Stone. "He had a totally different approach to what music is and had to build his own instruments so he could compose on a microtonal scale. That microtonal thinking pervades this album."

"The Werewolf" centers around a werewolf, also an angel of death, who is looking for victims. The song's origins came from Simon and his band experimenting with slowing down the tempo of a recording they made of the Peruvian percussion instrument Cajón, the Indian instrument gopichand, and hand claps. "Wristband" creates a narrative around a rock musician unable to gain entry into his own concert because he lacks the wristband required. "The Riverbank" was inspired by a teacher that Simon personally knew who was killed in the Sandy Hook Elementary School shooting in December 2012. It also takes root in a visit Simon made to wounded veterans at Walter Reed Hospital. "Proof of Love" and "In the Garden of Edie", meanwhile, stand as tributes to Simon's wife, musician Edie Brickell. The album also has continuity, with characters reappearing in songs. "The idea of finishing one song and having the character appear in another song appeals to me. I don't see why characters shouldn't appear more than once," said Simon. The instrumentals "The Clock" and "In the Garden of Edie" function as interludes, designed to give listeners "space." The two tracks were originally composed for John Patrick Shanley's play Prodigal Son, but went unused.

Release
Stranger to Stranger was first announced when Simon announced his tour dates in February 2016. It was officially announced with the lead single "Wristband" premiering online on April 7, 2016. The cover art for the album was taken from a portrait of Simon painted by artist Chuck Close.

Critical reception

Stranger to Stranger received widespread critical acclaim. At Metacritic, which assigns a normalized rating out of 100 to reviews from mainstream publications, the album received an average score of 85, based on 25 reviews. In Rolling Stone, Will Hermes said it was "as inviting, immaculately produced, jokey and unsettled a record as any he has ever made", while The Guardian Jon Dennis found the album "as rewarding as anything" Simon had recorded before, showcasing a "tenacious pursuit of new sounds". Jonathan Bernstein of Entertainment Weekly called Stranger to Stranger "one of his very boldest collections to date", an album "brimming with concepts and sounds that push Simon’s musical boundaries further than ever".

Randy Lewis from the Los Angeles Times believed the record was "pop music at its most artful and relevant, a sentiment from a septuagenarian representative of rock’s old guard that's arguably as potent as anything from seemingly more streetwise artists one-third his age". The Independent Andy Gill hailed it as Simon's "best in several years", and Steve Smith of The Boston Globe considered it his "richest, most instantly appealing collection since Graceland (1986)". Dan Weiss was somewhat less impressed in Spin, lamenting the music's "novelty electronics", which he said "make everything feel sillier than it is (not inherently a bad thing), but they also fail to get into a groove (which is)".

Accolades

Commercial performance
The album debuted at No. 1 on the UK Albums Chart, selling 19,218 copies in its first week. At the age of 74, Paul Simon was the oldest male solo artist to chart at No. 1 in the UK. It is his first No. 1 studio album since 1990's The Rhythm of the Saints. In the United States, Stranger to Stranger debuted at No. 3 on the Billboard 200 with first-week sales of 68,000 units. The album was the overall best-selling album for the week based on pure album sales (67,000 copies). It is Simon's highest charting album in over 29 years, since Graceland (1986).

Track listing

Personnel
 Paul Simon – vocals, acoustic guitar, electric guitar, autoharp, baritone guitar, bass harmonica, celeste, chromelodeon, clock, glockenspiel, gopichand, harmonium, mbira, percussion, twelve-string guitar
 Bobby Allende – congas
 David Broome – chromelodeon 
 C.J. Camerieri – French horn, trumpet
 Clap! Clap! – electronic drums, programming, synthesizer 
 Jack DeJohnette – drums (tracks 9 and 11)
 Dean Drummond – bamboo marimba, zoomoozophone
 Dave Eggar – cello
 Alan Ferber, Wycliffe Gordon – trombone
 Gil Goldstein – string arrangements 
 Golden Gate Quartet – backing vocals 
 Nelson González – maracas, très 
 Jamey Haddad – brushes, hadjira, percussion
 Paul Halley – Hammond organ 
 Carlos Henriquez, Bakithi Kumalo – bass guitar
 Katie Kresek – viola
 Steve Marion – slide guitar 
 Sergio Martínez – handclaps, percussion 
 Bobby McFerrin, Keith Montie – backing vocals 
 Nico Muhly – celeste, orchestra bells, horn and flute arrangements 
 Vincent Nguini – electric guitar, acoustic guitar
 Jim Oblon – drums, programming, electronic drums, percussion
 Nino de los Reyes – handclaps, percussion
 Oscar de los Reyes – handclaps, percussion 
 Marcus Rojas – tuba
 Mick Rossi – glockenspiel, harmonium, piano, Fender Rhodes
 Andy Snitzer – saxophone, backing vocals 
 Jared Soldiviero – bamboo marimba, bowed marimba, cloud chamber bowls, harmonic canon 
 Alex Sopp – flute
 Mark Stewart – big boing mbira, trombadoo

Charts

Weekly charts

Year-end charts

Certifications

References

External links
 

2016 albums
Paul Simon albums
Albums produced by Roy Halee
Albums produced by Paul Simon